South Wind is a 1917 novel by British author Norman Douglas. It is Douglas's most famous book and his only success as a novelist. It is set on an imaginary island called Nepenthe, located off the coast of Italy in the Tyrrhenian Sea, a thinly fictionalized description of Capri's residents and visitors. The narrative concerns twelve days during which Thomas Heard, a bishop returning to England from his diocese in Africa, yields his moral vigour to various influences. Philosophical hedonism pervades much of Douglas's writing, and the novel's discussion of moral and sexual issues caused considerable debate.

The South Wind of the title is the Sirocco, which wreaks havoc with the islanders' sense of decency and morality. Much of the natural detail in the book is provided by Capri and other Mediterranean locations that Douglas knew well. The island's name Nepenthe denotes a drug of Egyptian origin (mentioned in the Odyssey) which was capable of banishing grief or trouble from the mind. The novel was written in Capri and in London, and after its publication in June 1917 it went through seven editions rapidly, achieving startling large-scale success. Critics at the time complained about the lack of a well-constructed plot. The book was adapted for the stage in London in 1923 by Isabel C. Tippett, and Graham Greene considered the possibility of writing a film script based on it.

In Dorothy Sayers's 1926 detective novel Clouds of Witness, Lord Peter Wimsey goes through the possessions of a murdered man – a young British man living in Paris, whose morality had been put in question. Finding a copy of South Wind Wimsey remarks "Our young friend works out very true to type". In Robert McAlmon's Being Geniuses Together, he mentions meeting Norman Douglas in Venice in 1924, by which time he says South Wind was a minor classic. Apparently when sales continued for years afterwards, Douglas, to whom only a small amount was paid to begin with, received no further payments.

References

Bibliography

External links 
South Wind at Project Gutenberg.

1917 British novels
Capri, Campania
Campania in fiction
Novels set in Italy